Golden means made of, or relating to gold.

Golden may also refer to:

Places

United Kingdom
Golden, in the parish of Probus, Cornwall
Golden Cap, Dorset
Golden Square, Soho, London
Golden Valley, a valley on the River Frome in Gloucestershire
Golden Valley, Herefordshire

United States
Golden, Colorado, a town West of Denver, county seat of Jefferson County
Golden, Idaho, an unincorporated community
Golden, Illinois, a village
Golden Township, Michigan
Golden, Mississippi, a village
Golden City, Missouri, a city
Golden, Missouri, an unincorporated community
Golden, Nebraska, ghost town in Burt County
Golden Township, Holt County, Nebraska
Golden, New Mexico, a sparsely populated ghost town
Golden, Oregon, an abandoned mining town
Golden, Texas, an unincorporated community
Golden, Utah, a ghost town
Golden, Marshall County, West Virginia, an unincorporated community

Elsewhere
Golden, County Tipperary, Ireland, a village on the River Suir
Golden Vale, Munster, Ireland, a fertile agricultural area
Golden, British Columbia, Canada, a town
Golden, an incorporated township merged into the municipality of Red Lake, Ontario, Canada
Golden Bay / Mohua, New Zealand
Golden Beach (Paros), Greece
Golden Beach (Hong Kong)
Golden Beach, Chennai, India
Golden Hill, Hong Kong
Golden Mountains (Sudetes), on the border between Poland and the Czech Republic
4423 Golden, an asteroid

Business
Golden Air, a Swedish regional airline
Golden Artist Colors, an American manufacturer of acrylic paints and mediums
Golden Books, a division of Western Publishing
Golden Entertainment, an American operator of casinos, taverns, and slot routes, based in Nevada
Golden Films, an American film production company
Golden Records, a New York City record label
Golden Telecom, a Russian telecommunication company
Molson Golden, a brand of Canadian beer

Music
Golden (band), an American rock group
Golden (singer), an K-RNB Artist

Albums
 Golden (Rosita Vai album), 2005
 Golden (Kit Downes Trio album), 2009
 Golden (Lady Antebellum album), 2013
 Golden (EP), by Parade of Lights, 2014
 Golden (Romeo Santos album), 2017
 Golden (Kylie Minogue album), 2018

Songs
 "Golden" (Harry Styles song), 2020
 "Golden" (Zayn song), 2016
 "Golden" (Brandon Beal song), 2016
 "Golden" (Kingswood song), 2017
 "Golden" (Kylie Minogue song), 2018
 "Golden" (Lady Antebellum song), 2014
 "Golden" (Travie McCoy song), 2015
 "Golden" (Jill Scott song), 2004
 "Golden", by Fall Out Boy from Infinity on High
 "Golden", by Hieroglyphics from The Kitchen
 "Golden", by Monrose from Strictly Physical
 "Golden", by My Morning Jacket from It Still Moves 
 "Golden", by Cliff Richard from 75 at 75
 "Golden", by Switchfoot from Nothing Is Sound
 "Golden", by Tyler, the Creator from Goblin
 "Golden", by The Wanted from The Wanted

Tours
 Golden Tour, a 2018-19 concert tour by Kylie Minogue

Transportation
Golden Highway, New South Wales, Australia
Golden Road (Maine), United States, a private road
Golden Bridge, Gujarat, India

Other uses
Golden (chimpanzee)
Golden (knowledge base), an American knowledge base and online encyclopedia
Golden (name), a family name and, less frequently, a given name
Golden (sculpture), a 2013 steel work by Wolfgang Buttress near Tunstall, Stoke-on-Trent, England
Golden Baseball League, a former California independent baseball league (2004–10)
Golden High School, Golden, Colorado, United States
Golden, a novel by Cameron Dokey
Hong Kong Golden FC, former name of football club Sun Hei SC

See also 
Chaitanya Mahaprabhu, also known as the Gaura ("Golden One"), a 15th-century Hindu monk and social reformer
Mas River (Golden River in Javanese)
Zarrineh River, Zarriné-Rūd means "golden river" in Persian
Golden City (disambiguation)
Golden Rock Railway Workshop, Tiruchirapalli, Tamil Nadu, India